Sattowali is a village in Jalandhar district of Punjab State, India. The village is administrated by a sarpanch who is an elected representative of village as per Panchayati raj (India). Maximum community of the village are from chammar caste. Theses one Angarwari School and one Primary School upto class 5th in the village. Other Private schools Imperial School and Rainbow Public School are at distance of less than one KM only.

See also
List of villages in India

References

External links
List of villages in Jalandhar district at Census of India, 2011

Villages in Jalandhar district